Adulis is a genus of snout moths. It was described by Émile Louis Ragonot in 1891.

Species
Adulis serratalis Ragonot, 1891
Adulis distrigalis Ragonot, 1891

References

Pyralinae
Pyralidae genera
Taxa named by Émile Louis Ragonot